Nios or NIOS may refer to:

Places
 Ios or Nios, a Greek island

Computing
 Network I/O System, Digital Research's NIOS component in CP/NET in the 1980s
 NetWare I/O Subsystem, Novell's NIOS component in the 32-bit network clients in the mid-1990s
 Nios embedded processor, Altera 16-bit embedded processor
 Nios II, Altera 32-bit embedded processor

Other uses
 National Institute of Open Schooling, the board of education in India
 Hyundai Grand i10 Nios, a 2019–present Korean-Indian city car

See also
 NetBIOS
 Lake Nyos, a crater lake in Cameroon
 NIO (disambiguation), for the singular of NIOs